Afghan frozen assets are assets that were frozen in the United States and around the world following the 2021 Fall of Kabul and the subsequent collapse of the Islamic Republic of Afghanistan against the Taliban. The Afghan frozen assets are the second-largest amount of financial money from a country that was seized by the US since the Iranian frozen assets from 1980.

Background
Prior to the 2021 takeover of Afghanistan by the Taliban, Da Afghanistan Bank had approximately $7 billion dollars of reserves on deposit at the Federal Reserve Bank of New York, in addition to $2 billion in Europe.

History
After the fall of Kabul in August 2021, the Biden administration froze the funds in New York, because it was unclear who had the legal authority to access the account.

On 11 February 2022, President Joe Biden announced that he intended to move $3.5 billion dollars from the account to a trust fund to support humanitarian assistance in Afghanistan, and reserve $3.5 billion for potential legal claims by families of the victims of the September 11 attacks.
On 26 August 2022, a judge recommended to not award damages as the bank is "immune from jurisdiction" and that it would "acknowledge" the Taliban as the legitimate Afghan government.

Aftermath 
The assets freeze led to economic collapse, high unemployment, and widespread hunger. According to Save the Children, 50% population faces extreme hunger.

References

2021 in Afghanistan
2022 in Afghanistan
Economy of Afghanistan
Islamic Republic of Afghanistan
War in Afghanistan (2001–2021)
Afghanistan–United States relations
Presidency of Joe Biden
United States sanctions
Bank regulation in the United States
Legal issues related to the September 11 attacks